This is a list of units of the Seventh Day Adventist Reform Movement, sorted by region.

African Region
 Angolan Union
 Central Angolan Field
 North Angolan Field
 South Angolan Field
 Bandundu Mission
 Botswana Mission
 Burundi Mission
 Cameroon Mission
 Central Nigerian Mission
 East-Central African Mission
 East Congo Mission
 East Nigerian Mission
 Equator Mission
 Ghana Mission
 Kasai Occidental Mission
 Kasai-Oriental Mission
 Malawi Mission
 Mozambique Mission
 North Congo Mission
 North Kivu Mission
 Resda Mission Field
 Rwandan Field
 Seychelles Mission Field
 South African Field
 South Kivu Mission
 Tanzanian Mission
 Ugandan Mission
 West Congo Mission
 Zambian Mission
 Zimbabwean Mission

Asian Region
 Burmese Field
 Indonesian Field
 Nepali Mission
 North Indian Union
 Pakistani Mission
 Philippine Union
 South Indian Union Mission
 Sri Lankan Mission

Central American Region
 Central American Union
 Dominican Field
 Haitian Field
 Martinique Field
 Mexican Union
 Puerto Rican Mission
 St. Lucian Mission Field

Eurasian Region
 Czechoslovak Mission Field
 East European Union
 Israeli Mission Field
 Moldavian Union
 Polish Field

European Region
 Austrian Field
 British Mission
 Bulgarian Field
 Finnish Mission Field
 French Field
 German Union
 Hungarian Field
 Italian Field
 Portuguese Field
 Romanian Union
 South Slavonic Union
 Spanish Field

North American Region
 East Canadian Field
 East-Central United States Field
 Eastern United States Field
 Southeast United States Field
 West Canadian Mission Field
 Western United States Union
 Central United States Field
 Desert Mission
 Nevada Mission 
 Northern California Conference
 Pacific Northwest Mission
 Southern California Conference

Pacific Region
 Australasian Union
 French Polynesian Field
 Korean Field
 Mongolian Mission
 New Caledonia Mission Field
 Nippon Mission Field
 North Chinese Union
 South Chinese Union
 South Pacific Union Mission
 Vietnamese Mission

South American Region
 Bolivian Union
 Chilean Union
 Colombian Field
 Ecuadorian Field
 Guyanese Mission
 North Brazilian Union
 Peruvian Union
 South American Southern Union
 South Brazilian Union
 Venezuelan Field

See also 
 Seventh Day Adventist Reform Movement
 SDARM General Conference

References 
The Reformation Herald, January - March 2004, pp. 10, 34, 35.
The Reformation Herald, January - March 2008, pp. 18.

External links 

Units